The 2013 Tour of Britain was the tenth running of the current Tour of Britain and the 74th British tour in total. The race consisted of eight stages, starting on 15 September in Peebles, and finishing on 22 September in London. The race was part of the 2013 UCI Europe Tour, and was categorised by the UCI as a 2.1 category race.

Sir Bradley Wiggins won the race after gaining a lead in the stage 3 time trial.

Teams

19 teams were invited to participate in the tour: 5 UCI ProTeams, 6 UCI Professional Continental Teams, 7 UCI Continental Teams and one national team.

Stages
Notable stages were Stage 6, which featured the race's first ever summit finish, and Stage 3, an individual time trial, something absent in the previous edition.

Stage 1
15 September 2013 – Peebles to Drumlanrig Castle,

Stage 2
16 September 2013 – Carlisle to Kendal,

Stage 3
17 September 2013 – Knowsley,  individual time trial (ITT)

Stage 4
18 September 2013 – Stoke-on-Trent to Llanberis,

Stage 5
19 September 2013 – Machynlleth to Caerphilly,

Stage 6
20 September 2013 – Sidmouth to Haytor,

Stage 7
21 September 2013 – Epsom to Guildford,

Stage 8
22 September 2013 – London to London,

Classification leadership

References

External links

2013
2013 in British sport
2013 UCI Europe Tour
September 2013 sports events in the United Kingdom